92 in the Shade is a 1975 American drama film written and directed by Thomas McGuane, based on his 1973 novel of the same name, it stars Peter Fonda, Warren Oates, Elizabeth Ashley and Margot Kidder.

Plot
Tom Skelton, a young man, opens a charter fishing business in Key West, Florida. He enters into a rivalry with a local sea captain named Dance and his partner Carter, who steal one of the new fishing guide's clients. Skelton retaliates by burning Dance's boat.

Cast
 Peter Fonda as Tom Skelton
 Warren Oates as Nicholas Dance
 Margot Kidder as Miranda
 Burgess Meredith as Goldsboro
 Harry Dean Stanton as Faron Carter
 Elizabeth Ashley as Jeannie Carter
 Sylvia Miles as Bella
 John Quade as Roy
 Joe Spinell as Ollie Slatt

Production
Thomas McGuane directed the film and wrote the script. He was married to one of the film's female stars and had a scandalous affair with the other, as detailed in the autobiography Actress authored by Elizabeth Ashley.

The film is known for having two different versions, each with different endings. One has a happy ending in which Dance and Skelton fight while they're in the boat and Dance's gun gets thrown in the water, and then they both agree to stop their fight and become friends, but other version has darker ending in which Dance shoots and kills Skelton. In the book Warren Oates: A Wild Life by Susan Compo, Peter Fonda said there was another third ending which was filmed, but which was never used in any version of the film:

Fonda said he was "not exactly thrilled with" the film saying "I hoped it would turn out to be a better film. I like it in some ways. ..I'm not happy with the editing and some of the music. You know, it was a film I very much wanted to produce myself, but Eliot Kastner got his hands on the property and  produced it. I'm not crazy about Kastner. You see, after he gets a project off the ground, he usually doesn't give a rat's ass about it".

Release
Although the film was a box-office failure, a January 1976 review in The New York Times described it as "more satisfying" than Rancho Deluxe, another 1975 film written by Thomas McGuane.

See also
 List of American films of 1975

References

External links

1975 films
1970s English-language films
Films about fishing
Films set in Florida
1975 drama films
United Artists films
American drama films
1970s American films